Intrastate airlines in the U.S. are defined as air carriers operating inside of one individual state and thus not flying across state lines. Larger intrastate airlines in the U.S. that operated mainline turboprop and/or jet aircraft were created as a result of former federal airline regulations, as passenger air carriers that only flew intrastate service were not regulated by the federal government but were instead primarily regulated by the respective state governments in their home states. For example, Pacific Southwest Airlines (PSA) and Air California were both regulated by the California Public Utilities Commission (CPUC) prior to the federal Airline Deregulation Act of 1978. Although intrastate airlines in some states used only turboprop aircraft, scheduled passenger service on jet aircraft was operated by intrastate air carriers in California, Florida, Hawaii and Texas.

History
Intrastate airlines were created as a result of U.S. federal government regulation of the airline industry. A number of intrastate airlines were also commuter or regional air carriers primarily operating smaller prop and/or turboprop passenger aircraft. These airlines connected smaller cities within their home state to the larger cities and airline hubs in the same state.

Due to Civil Aeronautics Board (CAB) regulations governing interstate air transportation, smaller airlines and start up carriers were often able to find niche markets in their home states. By not crossing state lines, an intrastate airline was not required to seek CAB's approval of which routes it flew within its home state and the fares it charged.

Several intrastate air carriers in the U.S. operated larger mainline turboprop and/or mainline jet aircraft in the states of Alaska, California, Florida, Hawaii, and Texas in the past.  These airlines included:

 Air California operating Lockheed L-188 Electra propjets as well as  Boeing 737-100, 737-200 and Douglas DC-9-10 jets in California
 Air Florida operating Boeing 707 and Douglas DC-9-10 jets as well as Lockheed L-188 Electra propjets in Florida
 Aloha Airlines operating Vickers Viscount propjets followed by British Aircraft Corporation BAC One-Eleven, Boeing 737-200, Boeing 737-300 and Boeing 737-400 jets on interisland flights in Hawaii
 Hawaiian Airlines operating Vickers Viscount propjets followed by Douglas DC-9-10, McDonnell Douglas DC-9-30, McDonnell Douglas DC-9-50 and McDonnell Douglas MD-81 jets on interisland flights in Hawaii
 Great Northern Airlines operating Lockheed L-188 Electra propjets in Alaska
 Holiday Airlines operating Lockheed L-188 Electra propjets in California
 MarkAir operating Boeing 737-200 jets in Alaska
 Muse Air operating McDonnell Douglas MD-80 jets in Texas 
 Pacific Southwest Airlines (PSA) operating Lockheed L-188 Electra propjets as well as Boeing 727-100, 727-200, 737-200, McDonnell Douglas DC-9-30 and Lockheed L-1011 TriStar jets in California
 Southwest Airlines operating Boeing 737-200 jets in Texas

Pacific Southwest Airlines was the only U.S.-based intrastate air carrier ever to operate wide body jetliners in the form of the Lockheed L-1011.  Before introducing the turboprop powered Lockheed L-188 Electra into its fleet in 1959 followed later by jet aircraft, PSA operated Douglas DC-3, DC-4 and DC-6 piston powered propliners during the 1950s.

Most of the above airlines then added other jetliner types to their aircraft fleets after commencing interstate service in the U.S.  For example, AirCal and PSA both added British Aerospace BAe 146-200 and McDonnell Douglas MD-80 jets to their respective fleets with AirCal also introducing Boeing 737-300 jets.  Muse Air added McDonnell Douglas DC-9-30 and DC-9-50 jets to its fleet.  Air Florida added Boeing 727-100, 727-200, 737-100, 737-200, Douglas DC-8-62 and McDonnell Douglas DC-10-30 jets to its fleet with the DC-8 and wide body DC-10 being used for transatlantic international flights.  Southwest added Boeing 737-300, 737-500, 737-700 and 737-800 jetliners to its fleet and also operated Boeing 727-200 jets at one point.  Aloha added Boeing 737-700 and Boeing 737-800 jets for flights to west coast of the U.S. and Canada as well as to South Pacific destinations.  Hawaiian added Douglas DC-8-62, Douglas DC-8-63, Lockheed L-1011 TriStar and McDonnell Douglas DC-10 jets followed by Boeing 767-300 and Airbus A330 jets for flights to the U.S. mainland as well as to international destinations and also subsequently operated McDonnell Douglas MD-81 jets on its interisland flights in Hawaii.  Hawaiian currently operates Boeing 717-200 jets and ATR 42-500 propjets on its interisland flights.

Following the federal Airline Deregulation Act of 1978, several intrastate airlines in the U.S. that were operating mainline jet aircraft then expanded with interstate service and in some cases international flights.  One of the most successful former intrastate carriers which continues to exist is Southwest Airlines. Other airlines which started with intrastate services such as Air California (subsequently renamed AirCal), Air Florida, Pacific Southwest Airlines (PSA) and Muse Air (subsequently renamed TranStar Airlines) were subjected to post-deregulation mergers, acquisitions, or bankruptcies and no longer exist as individual airline companies. Also following the Airline Deregulation Act, those airlines previously classified and listed in the Official Airline Guide (OAG) as operating as an "Intrastate Air Carrier" were no longer listed as intrastate airlines in flight schedules published in the OAG.

Former intrastate air carriers in the U.S.

Air carriers noted in bold operated jet aircraft on their intrastate flights; all of them, except for Discovery Airways and Tahoe Air, subsequently expanded their operations with scheduled interstate service in the U.S. Intrastate route information is primarily taken from the route maps and system timetables sections of the departedflights.com website as well as the system timetables section of the timetablesimages.com website.

AirCal, Air Florida, Aloha Airlines, Hawaiian Airlines, PSA, and Southwest eventually operated scheduled international flights as well.

Hawaiian Airlines, Horizon Air, SkyWest, and Southwest are the only airlines on this list currently still operating.

 Air California - The airline began operations in 1967 with Lockheed L-188 Electra turboprop service nonstop between Orange County Airport (now John Wayne Airport) and San Francisco International Airport.  In 1976, Air California was primarily operating Boeing 737-200 jetliners as well as Electra propjets and was serving Lake Tahoe (served via the Lake Tahoe Airport with the Electra), Oakland, Ontario, Orange County, Palm Springs, Sacramento, San Francisco, San Diego and San Jose. The airline subsequently expanded its service to destinations in Alaska, Arizona, Illinois, Nevada, Oregon and Washington state as well as British Columbia in Canada, changed its name to AirCal and was then acquired by American Airlines after commencing interstate and international flights.
 Air Florida - The airline began operations in 1972 with Boeing 707 jetliners with service to Miami, Orlando and St. Petersburg (via the St. Pete-Clearwater International Airport) and was the only airline in the U.S. to operate the 707 in intrastate service.  By 1975, Lockheed L-188 Electra propjets had replaced the Boeing 707s with service being operated into Miami, Orlando, Tallahassee and Tampa.  In 1977, Gainesville and Jacksonville had been added to the route system with Douglas DC-9-10 jet service also having been introduced by this time and by 1978 Daytona Beach, Fort Lauderdale, Panama City, Pensacola and West Palm Beach in Florida had been added as well.  The airline then expanded during the late 1970s and early 1980s with new domestic service to destinations in Georgia, Illinois, Indiana, Louisiana, Massachusetts, Michigan, New Jersey, New York, Ohio, Pennsylvania, Rhode Island, South Carolina, Texas and Vermont as well as Washington, D.C.  A major international expansion was also initiated at this same time from Air Florida's Miami hub with service to Amsterdam, Brussels, Düsseldorf, Frankfurt, London, Madrid, Oslo, Shannon, Stockholm and Zurich in Europe in addition to flights to many destinations in the Caribbean and Central America as well as the Bahamas with service to Bermuda from the New York City area also being operated.  Air Florida ceased operations in 1984 after declaring bankruptcy following commencement of interstate and international services.
Air Illinois - according to the Official Airline Guide (OAG), Air Illinois, which was a commuter air carrier, operated a separate, stand alone intrastate operation in Illinois with nonstop service between Chicago Meigs Field and the state capital in Springfield, IL utilizing Hawker Siddeley HS 748 turboprops.  Air Illinois also operated British Aircraft Corporation BAC One-Eleven jets as well as commuter turboprop aircraft on interstate services.
 Air Mid-America Airlines - operated Convair 600 turboprops in the state of Illinois
Air Pacific (United States) - operated in the state of California.  Formerly operated as Eureka Aero.
 Air Sierra - operated in the state of California
 Air Texas - operated in the state of Texas 
 Alamo Commuter Airlines - operated in the state of Texas 
 Aloha Airlines - initially operated interisland flights beginning in 1946 in the state of Hawaii with Douglas C-47 prop aircraft followed by Fairchild F-27 and Vickers Viscount turboprop airliners.  Aloha then began operating interisland jet service, first with the British Aircraft Corporation BAC One-Eleven and later with Boeing 737-200, 737-300 and 737-400 jets.  The airline subsequently expanded its service to the west coast of the U.S. and Canada using Boeing 737-700 and 737-800 jets and also operated flights to South Pacific destinations.  Aloha was shut down on March 31, 2008 following 62 years of service.
Amistad Airlines - operated in the state of Texas 
 Apache Airlines - operated in the state of Arizona
 Argonaut Airways - operated Douglas DC-3 aircraft in the state of Florida
Arizona Airways - initially operated within the state of Arizona during the 1940s with Douglas DC-3 aircraft and then expanded operations into New Mexico and Texas.  Merged with Challenger Airlines and Monarch Airlines to form the original Frontier Airlines (1950-1986).
Aspen Airways - initially operated within the state of Colorado before expanding flights to destinations in California, Iowa, North Dakota, Montana, New Mexico, South Dakota, Texas, Utah and Wyoming and then subsequently introduced British Aerospace BAe 146-100 jet service from its Denver hub and also from Aspen Pitkin County Airport with Convair 580 turboprops being operated as well
Austin Express - operated in the state of Texas
 Cable Commuter Airlines - operated in the state of California.  Merged with Golden West Airlines.
California Central Airlines - operated in the state of California
Cal Sierra Airlines - operated Convair 580 turboprops between the Lake Tahoe Airport and San Diego in California
 Chaparral Airlines - initially operated as an independent airline in Texas and subsequently became an American Eagle air carrier 
Cochise Airlines - initially operated within the state of Arizona and then expanded service to California and New Mexico
 Commutaire - operated in the state of Florida
Conquest Airlines - operated in the state of Texas 
 Dallas Express - operated in the state of Texas 
 Dash Air - operated in the state of California
 Discovery Airways - operated interisland flights in the state of Hawaii with British Aerospace BAe 146-200 jets
 Eagle Commuter Airlines - initially operated within the state of Texas before expanding service to Oklahoma
 Emerald Air (USA) - operated Douglas DC-9-10 jets and Fairchild Hiller FH-227 turboprops within the state of Texas in 1984 with service to Austin, Corpus Christi, Dallas/Fort Worth International Airport, Houston Intercontinental Airport, McAllen and San Antonio.  Following expansion of service to Wichita, Kansas and Omaha, Nebraska, Emerald Air ceased operations and filed for bankruptcy in 1985.
 Far West Airlines - operated NAMC YS-11 turboprop aircraft in the state of California
Florida Airlines - initially operated within the state of Florida and then expanded service to the Bahamas
Florida Atlantic Airlines - operated in the state of Florida
Florida Commuter Airlines - initially operated within the state of Florida and then expanded service to the Bahamas
 Fort Worth Airlines - operated NAMC YS-11 turboprop aircraft in the state of Texas and then expanded service to Oklahoma
 Futura Airlines - operated Lockheed Constellation propliners on intrastate routes in California in 1962 
 Golden South Airlines - operated in the state of Florida
 Golden West Airlines - operated an extensive route network in northern and southern California with high frequency service between Los Angeles International Airport (LAX) and Ontario (ONT), Oxnard (OXR), Orange County (SNA), San Diego (SAN) and Santa Barbara (SBA) with a fleet of de Havilland Canada DHC-6 Twin Otter, de Havilland Canada DHC-7 Dash 7 and Short 330 turboprop aircraft
 Hawaiian Airlines - initially operated interisland flights in the state of Hawaii with small prop aircraft including Sikorsky S-38 and Sikorsky S-43 flying boats followed by Douglas DC-3, Convair 340, Convair 440 and Douglas DC-6 propliners. Operated turboprops on interisland routes as well with such aircraft types as the Convair 640, Vickers Viscount, NAMC YS-11, de Havilland Canada DHC-7 Dash 7 and Short 330.  Jet aircraft operated on interisland services included the Douglas DC-9-10, McDonnell Douglas DC-9-30, McDonnell Douglas DC-9-50 and McDonnell Douglas MD-81.  The airline subsequently expanded its service to the U.S. west coast, Las Vegas and New York City as well as to South Pacific destinations and currently operates as a major air carrier with domestic and international routes while continuing to operate interisland service in Hawaii with Boeing 717-200 jets and ATR 42-500 propjets.
 Holiday Airlines - operated Lockheed L-188 Electra propjets on intrastate routes in northern and southern California with service primarily to Lake Tahoe Airport
 Horizon Air - initially operated within the state of Washington with Fairchild F-27 turboprops in 1981. It is a major regional airline operating flights with Bombardier Q400 propjets in Alaska, the western U.S. and western Canada on behalf of Alaska Airlines and is also now operating new Embraer E-175 regional jets.  Owned by Alaska Air Group which is also the corporate parent of Alaska Airlines and Virgin America.
Houston Metro Airlines - initially operated in southeast Texas beginning in 1969 with commuter airline service flown with de Havilland Canada DHC-6 Twin Otter turboprops to Houston Intercontinental Airport (IAH).  Houston Metro subsequently changed its name to Metro Airlines which in 1979 was serving Beaumont/Port Arthur, Clear Lake City (via the Clear Lake City STOLport), Dallas/Fort Worth International Airport (DFW), Galveston, Houston Intercontinental Airport, Lake Jackson, Longview and Victoria in Texas with Twin Otter and Short 330 turboprops.  Metro then expanded its operations into Louisiana while wholly owned subsidiary Metroflight Airlines expanded its flights into Oklahoma from north Texas with the latter air carrier eventually becoming the first American Eagle air carrier operating code sharing flights on behalf of American Airlines.
Island Air (Hawaii) - Hawaii Island Air operated interisland flights within the state of Hawaii.  Predecessor air carriers included Princeville Airways and Aloha IslandAir.  Turboprop aircraft operated over the years included the de Havilland Canada DHC-6 Twin Otter followed by the de Havilland Canada DHC-8 Dash 8, ATR 72 and Bombardier Q400.  Island Air ceased all flights on November 10, 2017 after 37 years of service. 
L'Express Airlines - initially operated within the state of Louisiana and then expanded operations into Texas 
 Mid Pacific Air - initially operated NAMC YS-11 turboprops on interisland flights in the state of Hawaii and then introduced Fokker F28 Fellowship interisland jet service.  Subsequently expanded to southern California and Las Vegas with NAMC YS-11 service.
 MarkAir - initially operated Boeing 737-200 jets in the state of Alaska before expanding service to the lower 48 states in the continental U.S.
 Monarch Airlines - operated in the state of Colorado
 Muse Air - the airline began intrastate flights in Texas in 1981 with McDonnell Douglas MD-80 jetliners between Dallas Love Field and Houston Hobby Airport in competition with Southwest Airlines.  By 1982, Muse Air had introduced flights to Tulsa followed by the initiation of new service during the mid 1980s to destinations in California, Florida, Louisiana and Nevada and was thus no longer an intrastate air carrier.  The airline subsequently changed its name to TranStar Airlines after being acquired by Southwest Airlines.
National Florida Airlines - operated in the state of Florida 
 Pacific Southwest Airlines (PSA) - the airline began operations in 1949 with Douglas DC-3 service operated on a routing of San Diego - Burbank - Oakland with San Francisco being added to the route system by 1953.  In 1978, the airline was primarily operating Boeing 727-200 jetliners as well as Lockheed L-188 Electra propjets and was serving Burbank, Fresno, Lake Tahoe (served via the Lake Tahoe Airport with the Electra), Long Beach, Los Angeles International Airport, Monterey, Oakland, Ontario, Sacramento, San Diego, San Francisco International Airport, San Jose and Stockton in California.  PSA was also the only intrastate air carrier to operate wide body jets with Lockheed L-1011 TriStar aircraft being flown on routes wholly within California primarily between Los Angeles (LAX) and San Francisco (SFO) in 1975.  The airline then expanded its domestic service to destinations in Arizona, Colorado, Idaho, Nevada, New Mexico, Oregon, Utah and Washington state and also operated international flights to Mexico.  PSA was acquired by USAir after commencing interstate and international services.  USAir was then renamed US Airways with this airline subsequently merging with American Airlines.
 Paradise Airlines - operated Lockheed Constellation propliner service between Lake Tahoe, Oakland and San Jose in northern California during the early 1960s
 Qwest Air - operated in the state of California
Rio Airways - operated independently in the state of Texas and subsequently became a Delta Connection air carrier 
Rocky Mountain Airways - initially operated within the state of Colorado before expanding service to destinations in Nebraska, New Mexico, South Dakota, Texas and Wyoming.  Also subsequently became a Continental Express air carrier.
 Shawnee Airlines - initially operated within the state of Florida with flights including de Havilland Canada DHC-6 Twin Otter service to the Walt Disney World Airport (also known as the Lake Buena Vista STOLport) in Walt Disney World before expanding service to the Bahamas
Sierra Mountain Airways - operated in the state of California
Skyway Aviation - operated in the state of Missouri
Skyway Commuter Airlines - operated in the state of Florida
SkyWest Airlines - initially operated within the state of Utah as a commuter air carrier with small Piper Aircraft piston powered aircraft with scheduled flights beginning in 1972.  Currently a major regional airline operating a large fleet of regional jet aircraft on behalf of Alaska Airlines, American Airlines, Delta Air Lines and United Airlines via respective code sharing agreements with these major air carriers.
 Southwest Airlines - the airline commenced operations in Texas in 1971 as an intrastate air carrier regulated by the state of Texas Aeronautics Commission with Boeing 737-200 jet service between Dallas, Houston and San Antonio.  Harlingen was added to the route system in 1975 with Austin, Corpus Christi, El Paso, Lubbock and Midland/Odessa being added in 1977 and Amarillo being added in 1978.  On January 25, 1979 Southwest began nonstop service between Houston and New Orleans and was thus no longer operating exclusively as an intrastate air carrier. In 2020, Southwest was the largest airline in the world by number of scheduled passengers carried.
Stol Air Commuter - operated Britten-Norman Islander and Trislander prop aircraft in northern California and was then renamed WestAir Commuter Airlines
 Swift Aire Lines - operated within the state of California and transitioned to a small fleet of Fokker F27 Friendship and Nord 262 turboprop aircraft
 Tahoe Air - operated Boeing 737-200 jet service into Lake Tahoe Airport in 1999 from Los Angeles and San Jose in California before ceasing all operations the same year
Tejas Airlines - operated in the state of Texas 
 Texas Airlines - operated in the state of Texas 
 Texas National Airlines - operated in the state of Texas 
 Trans California Airlines - operated Lockheed Constellation propliners in California in the early 1960s
Trans-Texas Airways (TTa) - initially operated within the state of Texas before expanding service to destinations in Arkansas, Louisiana, Mississippi, New Mexico and Tennessee as well as initiating international flights to Mexico followed by the introduction of Douglas DC-9-10 jets and then a name change to Texas International Airlines accompanied by additional expansion to other states with an eventual merger with Continental Airlines
 WestAir Commuter Airlines - initially operated as an independent airline in California with prop and turboprop aircraft and subsequently became a United Express air carrier operating British Aerospace BAe 146-200 jets as well as turboprop aircraft.  Eventually expanded its route network to include Arizona and Nevada operating as United Express.
 Westates Airlines - operated Convair 580 turboprops in the state of California
Wings West Airlines - initially operated as an independent airline in the state of California and subsequently became an American Eagle air carrier 
Yosemite Airlines - operated in the state of California
Zia Airlines - operated in the state of New Mexico

Unless otherwise noted, most of the above air carriers were commuter airlines that primarily operated smaller prop and/or turboprop aircraft.

References

Airlines
Aviation in the United States
Aviation history of the United States